Ebrima Sorry Buaro (born 16 September 2000) is a Gambian swimmer. He competed in the 2020 Summer Olympics.

References

2000 births
Living people
Swimmers at the 2020 Summer Olympics
Gambian male swimmers
Olympic swimmers of the Gambia
African Games competitors for the Gambia
Swimmers at the 2019 African Games
Swimmers at the 2022 Commonwealth Games
Commonwealth Games competitors for the Gambia
21st-century Gambian people